Sarah Elizabeth Kaufman (born September 20, 1985) is a retired Canadian mixed martial artist (MMA). She competed in the women's bantamweight division where she is a former Invicta FC Bantamweight Championship. Kaufman was the inaugural Strikeforce Women's Bantamweight Champion and was also the first and only Hardcore Championship Fighting Women's Bantamweight Champion.

Biography
Kaufman is a graduate of Claremont Secondary School and attended two years at the University of Victoria with a goal of becoming a cardiovascular surgeon. Kaufman's father is Jewish.

A dancer since the age of two, Kaufman had joined a dance company and danced everything from ballet to jazz to hip-hop. When she was 17, an MMA school was opened by Adam Zugec in the building where her dance company rehearsed. She joined the school for an aerobics kickboxing class. Enjoying it, she quickly began taking as many classes as Zugec offered.

While being interviewed on February 15, 2010 by MMA Junkie Radio, Kaufman revealed that she had obtained a purple belt in Brazilian Jiu-Jitsu. She was awarded her brown belt on October 1, 2011.

Mixed martial arts career
Kaufman faced Valérie Létourneau at TKO 29 - Repercussion on June 1, 2007. She won the fight via TKO in the second round. This was the first female MMA fight in the promotion's history.

She captured the Hardcore Championship Fighting Women's Bantamweight Championship by defeating Ginele Marquez via TKO in the second round at HCF - Title Wave on October 19, 2007.

Kaufman faced Molly Helsel at HCF - Crow's Nest on March 29, 2008. She won the fight via TKO in the second round. This was her only title defense before the promotion folded in 2008.

On April 23, 2009, she faced Sarah Schneider for Palace Fighting Championship and won the fight via TKO in the second round.

Kaufman debuted for Armageddon Fighting Championship on April 2, 2011 at the promotion's fifth event, Judgment Day, where she fought in front of her hometown of Victoria, British Columbia. She defeated Megumi Yabushita by TKO in the third round of the main event.

Strikeforce
Less than one month later on May 15, 2009 at Strikeforce Challengers: Evangelista vs. Aina, Kaufman made her Strikeforce debut as a late replacement against wrestler
Miesha Tate. Kaufman won the fight by Unanimous Decision. It was the first time that she had gone the distance in her career.

She fought again five weeks later on June 19, 2009 at Strikeforce Challengers: Villasenor vs. Cyborg against submission specialist Shayna Baszler and once again won via Unanimous Decision. The fight marked the first time that a women's bout was contested under five-minute rounds in Strikeforce.

Women's Bantamweight Champion
Kaufman was set to face highly touted Japanese standout Takayo Hashi at Strikeforce Challengers: Kaufman vs. Hashi on November 20, 2009, but the fight was later removed from the card. It was first rescheduled for January 2010, but finally took place on February 26, 2010. The fight crowned the first Strikeforce Women's Bantamweight Champion (135 lbs). Kaufman won the fight by Unanimous Decision.

In an interview posted on May 12, 2010, Kaufman stated that she was no longer under contract with Strikeforce. However, Strikeforce maintained that Kaufman's contract was automatically extended following her title victory over Takayo Hashi and she remained with the promotion.

Kaufman defended her Strikeforce title against Roxanne Modafferi at Strikeforce Challengers: del Rosario vs. Mahe on July 23, 2010. She won the fight via knockout due to a slam in the third round.

Kaufman faced Marloes Coenen on October 9, 2010 in San Jose, California. Kaufman was defeated by Coenen at 1:59 of the third round by submission after tapping out to an armbar applied from the bottom. This marked the first loss in Kaufman's MMA career and she relinquished the Women's Bantamweight Championship.

After losing Championship

On July 22, 2011, Kaufman defeated Liz Carmouche via unanimous decision at Strikeforce Challengers: Voelker vs. Bowling III in Las Vegas, Nevada.

On January 7, 2012, it was announced that Kaufman would face Alexis Davis in a rematch at Strikeforce: Tate vs. Rousey on March 3 in Columbus, Ohio. Kaufman won the back and forth bout via majority decision.

Kaufman challenged Women's Bantamweight Champion Ronda Rousey on August 18, 2012, in San Diego, California. She was defeated by submission due to an armbar early in the first round.

Kaufman's tenure with Strikeforce ended when the promotion ran its final show in January 2013, having been purchased and eventually closed by UFC owners Zuffa LLC.

Invicta Fighting Championships
Kaufman was scheduled to make her Invicta FC debut against Kaitlin Young at Invicta Fighting Championships 3 on October 6, 2012. However, on September 17, it was reported that Kaufman had suffered an injury and would not be able to compete.

Kaufman faced Leslie Smith at Invicta FC 5: Penne vs. Waterson on April 5, 2013. This was her promotional debut. She won the back-and-forth fight via split decision. The bout was named Fight of the Night.

Ultimate Fighting Championship
On February 25, 2013, Kaufman signed with the Ultimate Fighting Championship along with four other women. She was expected to make her promotional debut against Sara McMann at UFC Fight Night 27 on August 28, 2013. However, McMann withdrew from the bout for undisclosed personal reasons. As a result, Kaufman was pulled from the event as well.

Kaufman faced fellow UFC newcomer Jessica Eye at UFC 166 on October 19, 2013. She lost the fight via controversial split decision. However, in February 2014, the Texas Department of Licensing and Regulation changed the result to "no decision" with no reason given for the change. It was later revealed that Eye had failed her post-fight drug test for marijuana.

Kaufman was expected to face Shayna Baszler at The Ultimate Fighter Nations Finale. However, it was announced on April 1, 2014 that Baszler pulled out due to injury. Kaufman was then scheduled to face Amanda Nunes, but Nunes withdrew as well.  Kaufman eventually faced former opponent Leslie Smith on the card. She won the fight via unanimous decision.

After over a year away from the sport, Kaufman returned to face Alexis Davis for a third time on April 25, 2015 at UFC 186. Despite seemingly winning the first round due to her dominant striking, Kaufman lost the fight in the second round via submission.

Kaufman was scheduled to face Germaine de Randamie at UFC on Fox: dos Anjos vs. Cowboy 2. However, De Randamie pulled out of the fight on December 3 citing an injury.  Kaufman instead faced Valentina Shevchenko. She lost the fight via split decision.

Kaufman became a free agent after the UFC did not resign her to a new contract after the loss to Valentina Shevchenko.

Invicta Fighting Championships
It was announced  on December 6, 2017 that Kaufman was signed by Invicta Fighting Championships.

Kaufman faced Pannie Kianzad on January 13, 2018 at Invicta FC 27. At weight-ins, Kianzad weighted 136.7 Ibs, missing 1.7 Ibs of the upper limit of bantamweight of 135 Ibs and the bout proceeded at catchweight. Kianzad was fined twenty five percent of her purse for falling make weight. Kaufman won the fight via unanimous decision.

Kaufman faced German bantamweight Katharina Lehner at Invicta FC 29 on May 4 with the vacant Invicta FC bantamweight title on the line. Kaufman won the bout in the third round via rear-naked choke.

Professional Fighters League
In 2019, Kaufman joined the Professional Fighters League to compete in their Women's Lightweight tournament. In the opening round, she faced Morgan Frier at PFL 1 on May 9, 2019. She won the fight via an arm-triangle choke submission in the first round to earn 6 points in the first round.

Kaufman was expected to face Roberta Samad at PFL 4 on July 11, 2019. However, Samad missed weight and the bout was cancelled with Kaufman being awarded 3 points. In the semifinals, Kaufman faced Larissa Pacheco at PFL 7 on October 11, 2019. She lost the fight via unanimous decision.

Return to regional circuit 
Kaufman faced Bellator vet Jessy Miele on November 20, 2021 at BTC 13: Power. She won the bout via TKO due to ground and pound in the first round.

Kaufman was scheduled to face Cláudia Leite for the inaugural PAW FC Women's Bantamweight Championship at PAW FC 1 on January 15, 2022. However, the bout was cancelled after Leite was unable to obtain a visa.

Kaufman announced her retirement from MMA on June 30, 2022.

Championships and accomplishments

Mixed martial arts
Invicta Fighting Championships
Fight of the Night (One time) vs. Leslie Smith 
Invicta FC Bantamweight Championship (one time)
Strikeforce
Strikeforce Women's Bantamweight Championship (One time, first)
One successful title defense
Hardcore Championship Fighting
HCF Women's Bantamweight Championship (One time)
Women's MMA Awards
2009 Fighter of the Year
2009 Bantamweight Fighter of the Year
2012 Fight of the Year vs. Alexis Davis

Mixed martial arts record

|-
| Win
| align=center| 22–5 (1)
| Jessy Miele
| TKO (punches)
| BTC 13: Power
| 
| align=center| 1
| align=center|3:56 
| St Catharines, Canada
|.
|-
|Loss
|align=center|21–5 (1)
|Larissa Pacheco	
|Decision (unanimous)
|PFL 7
|
|align=center|3
|align=center|5:00
|Las Vegas, Nevada, United States
|.
|-
| Win
| align=center| 21–4 (1)
| Morgan Frier
| Submission (arm-triangle choke)
| PFL 1
| 
| align=center| 1 
| align=center| 2:22
| Uniondale, New York
| 
|-
| Win
| align=center| 20–4 (1)
| Katharina Lehner
| Submission (rear-naked choke)
| Invicta FC 29: Kaufman vs. Lehner
| 
| align=center| 3 
| align=center| 4:30
| Kansas City, Missouri
| 
|-
| Win
| align=center| 19–4 (1)
| Pannie Kianzad
| Decision (unanimous)
| Invicta FC 27: Kaufman vs. Kianzad
| 
| align=center| 3 
| align=center| 5:00 
| Kansas City, Missouri
| 
|-
| Win
| align=center| 18–4 (1)
| Jessica-Rose Clark
| Decision (unanimous)
| Battlefield FC: Korea
| 
| align=center| 3 
| align=center| 5:00 
| Seoul, South Korea
| 
|-
|Loss
|align=center|17–4 (1)
|Valentina Shevchenko
|Decision (split)
|UFC on Fox: dos Anjos vs. Cowboy 2 
|
|align=center|3
|align=center|5:00
|Orlando, Florida, United States
|
|-
| Loss
| align=center| 17–3 (1)
| Alexis Davis
| Submission (armbar)
| UFC 186
| 
| align=center| 2
| align=center| 1:52
| Montreal, Quebec, Canada
| 
|-
| Win
| align=center| 17–2 (1)
| Leslie Smith
| Decision (unanimous)
| The Ultimate Fighter Nations Finale: Bisping vs. Kennedy
| 
| align=center| 3 
| align=center| 5:00 
| Quebec City, Quebec, Canada
| 
|-
| NC
| align=center| 16–2 (1)
| Jessica Eye
| NC (overturned) 
| UFC 166
| 
| align=center| 3
| align=center| 5:00
| Houston, Texas, United States
| 
|-
| Win
| align=center| 16–2
| Leslie Smith
| Decision (split)
| Invicta FC 5: Penne vs. Waterson
| 
| align=center| 3
| align=center| 5:00
| Kansas City, Missouri, United States
| 
|-
| Loss
| align=center| 15–2
| Ronda Rousey
| Submission (armbar)
| Strikeforce: Rousey vs. Kaufman
| 
| align=center| 1
| align=center| 0:54
| San Diego, California, United States
| 
|-
| Win
| align=center| 15–1
| Alexis Davis
| Decision (majority)
| Strikeforce: Tate vs. Rousey
| 
| align=center| 3
| align=center| 5:00
| Columbus, Ohio, United States
| 
|-
| Win
| align=center| 14–1
| Liz Carmouche
| Decision (unanimous)
| Strikeforce Challengers: Voelker vs. Bowling III
| 
| align=center| 3
| align=center| 5:00
| Las Vegas, Nevada, United States
| 
|-
| Win
| align=center| 13–1
| Megumi Yabushita
| TKO (punches)
| AFC 5: Judgment Day
| 
| align=center| 3
| align=center| 3:34
| Victoria, British Columbia, Canada
| 
|-
| Loss
| align=center| 12–1
| Marloes Coenen
| Submission (armbar)
| Strikeforce: Diaz vs. Noons II
| 
| align=center| 3
| align=center| 1:59
| San Jose, California, United States
| 
|-
| Win
| align=center| 12–0
| Roxanne Modafferi
| KO (slam)
| Strikeforce Challengers: del Rosario vs. Mahe
| 
| align=center| 3
| align=center| 4:45
| Everett, Washington, United States
| 
|-
| Win
| align=center| 11–0
| Takayo Hashi
| Decision (unanimous)
| Strikeforce Challengers: Kaufman vs. Hashi
| 
| align=center| 5
| align=center| 5:00
| San Jose, California, United States
| 
|-
| Win
| align=center| 10–0
| Shayna Baszler
| Decision (unanimous)
| Strikeforce Challengers: Villasenor vs. Cyborg
| 
| align=center| 3
| align=center| 5:00
| Kent, Washington, United States
| 
|-
| Win
| align=center| 9–0
| Miesha Tate
| Decision (unanimous)
| Strikeforce Challengers: Evangelista vs. Aina
| 
| align=center| 3
| align=center| 3:00
| Fresno, California, United States
| 
|-
| Win
| align=center| 8–0
| Sarah Schneider
| TKO (punches)
| PFC: Best of Both Worlds 2
| 
| align=center| 2
| align=center| 1:43
| Lemoore, California, United States
| 
|-
| Win
| align=center| 7–0
| Molly Helsel
| TKO (punches)
| HCF: Crow's Nest
| 
| align=center| 2
| align=center| 2:44
| Gatineau, Quebec, Canada
| 
|-
| Win
| align=center| 6–0
| Ginele Marquez
| TKO (punches)
| HCF: Title Wave
| 
| align=center| 2
| align=center| 3:22
| Calgary, Alberta, Canada
| 
|-
| Win
| align=center| 5–0
| Valérie Létourneau
| TKO (punches)
| TKO 29: Repercussion
| 
| align=center| 2
| align=center| 1:36
| Montreal, Quebec, Canada
| 
|-
| Win
| align=center| 4–0
| Alexis Davis
| TKO (punches)
| UWC 7: Anarchy
| 
| align=center| 3
| align=center| N/A
| Winnipeg, Manitoba, Canada
| 
|-
| Win
| align=center| 3–0
| Misty Shearer
| TKO (doctor stoppage)
| King of the Cage: Amplified
| 
| align=center| 2
| align=center| 5:00
| Edmonton, Alberta, Canada
| 
|-
| Win
| align=center| 2–0
| Sarah Draht
| TKO (punches)
| King of the Cage: Insurrection
| 
| align=center| 1
| align=center| 0:17
| Vernon, British Columbia, Canada
| 
|-
| Win
| align=center| 1–0
| Liz Posener
| KO (punch)
| North American Challenge 23
| 
| align=center| 3
| align=center| 1:03
| Vancouver, British Columbia, Canada
|

See also
 List of female mixed martial artists
 List of Canadian UFC fighters

References

External links

 
 
 Sarah Kaufman at Invicta FC
 
 Sarah Kaufman at AwakeningFighters.com

1985 births
Living people
Canadian female mixed martial artists
Bantamweight mixed martial artists
Mixed martial artists utilizing kickboxing
Mixed martial artists utilizing Brazilian jiu-jitsu
Canadian people of German-Jewish descent
Canadian practitioners of Brazilian jiu-jitsu
People awarded a black belt in Brazilian jiu-jitsu
Female Brazilian jiu-jitsu practitioners
Sportspeople from Victoria, British Columbia
Strikeforce (mixed martial arts) champions
Ultimate Fighting Championship female fighters
21st-century Canadian women